Systomus sewelli is a species of ray-finned fish in the genus Systomus. It is found in India and Myanmar. Fishbase give the species name as Puntius morehensis but the Catalog of Fishes lists this name as a synonym  of Systomus sewelli,

References

Cyprinid fish of Asia
Fish described in 1929
Systomus